United Nations Security Council Resolution 2062 was unanimously adopted on 26 July 2012. It related to the situation in Cote d'Ivoire and extended the mandate of the United Nations Operation in Côte d’Ivoire (UNOCI) until July 2013.

See also 
List of United Nations Security Council Resolutions 2001 to 2100

References

External links
Text of the Resolution at undocs.org

2012 United Nations Security Council resolutions
United Nations Security Council resolutions concerning Ivory Coast
2012 in Ivory Coast
July 2012 events